Skurnik Wines & Spirits is a wine and spirits importer and distributor in the United States based in New York City. It represents over 300 brands.

History
Skurnik Wines & Spirits was founded in 1987 by Michael Skurnik, who started in the industry at Windows on the World restaurant under sommelier Kevin Zraly. Then, he worked in wine sales for Establishment Import Company (now defunct) and Mommessin.

Michael's brother, Harmon Skurnik, joined the company in 1989 after a 10-year career in marketing and advertising with stints at BBDO, Needham, Harper & Steers, and Market Facts.

The brothers jointly run Skurnik Wines, with Michael as chief executive officer and Harmon as president.

Skurnik moved its main offices from Syosset, New York, to Manhattan in the summer of 2014 and changed its name from Michael Skurnik Wines to Skurnik Wines to better reflect the entire family's involvement in the company.

Products
Skurnik manages a portfolio of over 300 brands from California, France, Italy, Germany, Austria, Australia, New Zealand, Greece, Chile, Hungary, and Slovenia. Food & Wine has recognized the Skurnik portfolio's strengths in grower Champagne, Burgundy, California, Austria, and Germany.

Skurnik also offers a selection of spirits, including tequila, El Dorado Rum, armagnac, brandy, cognac, gin, vermouth, bourbon whiskey, calvados, and Hans Reisetbauer's eaux-de-vie.

In 2017, Skurnik launched a Japan portfolio with offerings of craft Japanese sake and shochu. 

In 2018, Skurnik added British farmhouse ciders, reflecting the growing popularity of heritage ciders from the world's oldest cider apple growing regions.

References

Further reading

Companies based in New York City
Companies established in 1987
1987 establishments in New York (state)
Wine retailers
Drink companies of the United States